The Kidnapping of Princess Arelina is a fourteen-page accessory designed for the Dungeons & Dragons fantasy role-playing game.

Contents
Garry Spiegle wrote 3-D Dragon Tiles Featuring The Kidnapping of Princess Arelina as a supplement with two purposes in mind. First it included a fairly large number of cardboard cutouts of monsters, characters, and maps called Dragon Tiles. The latter could be configured in different ways to provide a variety of maps for the figure cutouts. Secondly, a small adventure, The Kidnapping of Princess Arelina, came in the same supplement.

Dragon tiles
The accessory contains a cardstock tile set that can be rearranged to create a dungeon map, and comes with cardboard pieces that represent furniture. Instructions for setting up the tiles are included, and the set is also designed to be usable with Advanced Dungeons & Dragons. The set includes both the cutouts needed to accurately layout the small tower, the enemies the group encounters, and the pre-generated characters for the players.

This package includes 51 3-D figures, featuring characters, creatures, walls, and doors. Two sheets of 84 two-sided feature tiles, showing traps, treasures, furniture, and special surprises, are also included. A Dungeon Mapping Grid is provided to help lay out dungeons quickly.

The Kidnapping of Princess Arelina

Levels
The design of the module expects the use of four to eight adventurers between second and fifth level.

Pre-generated Characters
Eight pre-generated characters come with the module so a group can begin the adventure immediately. They include: Berklai, a fourth level fighter; Awas, a fourth level magic-user; Triak, a fifth level cleric; Penchuri, a fourth level thief; Kuat, a third level ranger; Saudara, a third level magic-user; Teman, a fourth level cleric; and Ambil, a third level thief.

Plot summary
The plot involves the kidnapping of a royal woman. To take advantage of the castle tile set the entire adventure takes place indoors as the group searches a tower to free the princess. Eventually the group rescues the woman and returns her to the king for their just rewards.

Enemies
Ghoul
Rat, Giant
Rust Monster
Shadow
Skeleton
Spider, Huge
Wererat

Publication history
AC3 3-D Dragon Tiles featuring the Kidnapping of Princess Arelina was designed by Garry Spiegle, and published by TSR in 1984 as an 8-page pamphlet, two cardstock folders, and a cardboard counter sheet.

The 10th Anniversary Dungeons & Dragons Collector's Set boxed set, published by TSR in 1984, included the rulebooks from the Basic, Expert, and Companion sets; modules AC2, AC3, B1, B2, and M1, Blizzard Pass; Player Character Record Sheets; and dice; this set was limited to 1,000 copies, and was sold by mail and at GenCon 17.

Reception

References

External links
The Kidnapping of Princess Arelina at Deathranger.com

Dungeons & Dragons modules
Mystara
Role-playing game supplements introduced in 1984